Le Garçu is a 1995 French drama film directed by Maurice Pialat and starring Gérard Depardieu. It was Pialat's final work. He was dissatisfied with the film and even planned to re-edit it, but his failing health made that impossible.

Plot
Gérard, mentally still adolescent, adores Antoine, his four-year-old son with Sophie, his second and much younger wife. On a holiday to Mauritius, she finally can no longer stand his immature behaviour and returns with the child to Paris. Gérard is given a room by his ex-wife and finds himself company for the nights. Taking Sophie and Antoine for a holiday to Sables d'Olonne, they meet up with Jeannot and his partner. The woman pounces on Gérard for a night's fling, but Jeannot is seriously drawn to Sophie and, moving in with her, helps looks after little Antoine. When a hospital in Auvergne rings to say that Gérard's father (“le garçu” in the local dialect) is on his deathbed, Sophie unhesitatingly goes there with him. Her support brings the two closer again, but Gérard is never going to grow up and Jeannot has become a father to the child.

Cast
 Gérard Depardieu – Gérard
 Géraldine Pailhas – Sophie
 Antoine Pialat – Antoine
 Dominique Rocheteau – Jeannot
 Fabienne Babe – Cathy
 Élisabeth Depardieu – Micheline
 Claude Davy – Le Garçu
 Isabelle Costacurta – Isabelle

References

External links
 

1995 films
1990s French-language films
1995 drama films
Films directed by Maurice Pialat
French drama films
1990s French films